"Bad to Me" is a song credited to Lennon–McCartney. In late interviews, John Lennon said that he wrote it for Billy J. Kramer with The Dakotas while on holiday in Spain. However, in a 1964 interview he said that he and Paul McCartney wrote it in the back of a van, declaring McCartney a contributor. Bootlegs exist of Lennon's original demo of the song, which was recorded on 31 May 1963. An acoustic demo from the same era was released on iTunes in December 2013 on the album The Beatles Bootleg Recordings 1963.
It became one of the first occasions a Lennon–McCartney composition made the US Top 40 recorded by an artist other than the Beatles (the first being "A World Without Love" by Peter & Gordon; another being "Goodbye" by Mary Hopkin).

Chart performance
Billy J. Kramer with The Dakotas released their recording of the song in 1963 and it became their first number 1 in the UK Singles Chart. Paul McCartney was present during the recording session at Abbey Road Studios. The single was released in the US the following year, and was a top-ten hit there, reaching number 9.

Cover versions
Terry Black released a version of the song on his 1965 debut album, Only 16.
Graham Parker recorded a version of the song for the 2003 album Lost Songs of Lennon & McCartney, new versions of 17 Lennon–McCartney songs that were originally released by other artists. Leif Garrett also recorded a version of the song for his self-titled debut album. Finnish rock band Hurriganes covered this song in their third album, Crazy Days.
Recordings of "Bad to Me" as the Beatles may have performed it are available on the 1989 album by Bas Muys entitled Secret Songs: Lennon & McCartney and on the 1998 release It's Four You by the Australian tribute band The Beatnix.

References

External links
 

1963 songs
1963 singles
1964 singles
Songs written by Lennon–McCartney
The Beatles songs
Billy J. Kramer songs
Terry Black songs
Leif Garrett songs
Song recordings produced by George Martin
UK Singles Chart number-one singles
Parlophone singles